Fire Records (Pakistan) was a Pakistani record label owned by AAG TV. It managed many artists between 2006 and 2013. According to Pakistan's The News on Sunday, the label held a virtual monopoly over major music releases in Pakistan in the mid-to-late 2000s. The record label has been a subject of controversy since its inception and after it ceased operations as being responsible for the decline of the Pakistani music industry.

As we all know, music trends change nationally and worldwide with time. Music production and music distribution to the general public change with the times also and so they did in Pakistan. As of 2011, according to The Express Tribune newspaper, there seems to be a 'stalemate' in Pakistan's music economy and business which also affected the above recording label Fire Records (Pakistan).

Another Pakistani newspaper Dawn newspaper delivers even worse news in 2017. Its article goes into the recent pop music's over-commercialization and subsequent control of music artists by the recording label companies such as Fire Records (Pakistan). Later how then the public trends changed from now old cassette tapes to CDs to digital streaming of music on the public internet now.

Artists 

Amanat Ali
Abrar-ul-Haq
Ahmed Jahanzeb
Ali Azmat
Ali Zafar
Atif Aslam
Attaullah Khan Esakhelvi
Call (band)
Hadiqa Kiani
Humaira Arshad
Jal
Jawad Ahmad
Junaid Jamshed
Laal
Najam Khan
Najam Sheraz
Rabi Peerzada
Rahat Fateh Ali Khan
Roxen
Sami Yusuf
Sajid & Zeeshan
Sajjad Ali
Shahbaz Khan
Shehzad Roy
Strings
The Sketches
Waris Baig
Zeb and Haniya
Zohaib Hassan

See also 
 Rearts
 List of record labels

References

Pakistani record labels
Indie rock record labels
Alternative rock record labels
Geo TV